Garret Colley Wesley, 1st Earl of Mornington (19 July 1735 – 22 May 1781) was an Anglo-Irish politician and composer, as well as the father of several distinguished military commanders and politicians of Great Britain and Ireland.

Early life
Wesley was born at the family estate of Dangan Castle, near Summerhill, a village near Trim in County Meath, Ireland. He was a son of Richard Wesley, 1st Baron Mornington (son of Henry Colley, MP), and Elizabeth Sale (a daughter of John Sale, Registrar of the Diocese of Dublin).

He was educated at Trinity College Dublin, and was elected its first Professor of Music in 1764. From early childhood he showed extraordinary talent on the violin, and soon began composing his own works. As a composer he is remembered chiefly for glees such as "Here in cool grot" (lyrics by William Shenstone) and for a double Anglican chant. It was the future Duke of Wellington who, alone of his children, inherited something of his musical talent.

Career
Wesley represented Trim in the Irish House of Commons from 1757 until 1758, when he succeeded his father as 2nd Baron Mornington. In 1759 he was appointed Custos Rotulorum of Meath and in 1760, in recognition of his musical and philanthropic achievements, he was created Viscount Wellesley, of Dangan Castle in the County of Meath, and Earl of Mornington.

He was elected Grand Master of the Grand Lodge of Ireland in 1776, a post he held until the following year. Like his father, and his mother-in-law Lady Dungannon, he was careless with money, and his early death left the family exposed to financial embarrassment, leading ultimately to the decision in the nineteenth century to sell all their Irish estates.

Personal life
Wesley married Anne Hill-Trevor, eldest daughter of the banker Arthur Hill-Trevor, 1st Viscount Dungannon, and his wife Anne Stafford, on 6 February 1759. His godmother, the famous diarist Mary Delany, said the marriage was happy, despite his lack of financial sense and her "want of judgment". They had nine children, most of whom were historically significant, including:

 Richard Wellesley, 1st Marquess Wellesley (1760–1842), who married Hyacinthe-Gabrielle Roland, daughter of Pierre Roland, in 1794. After her death, he married Marianne Caton, daughter of Richard Caton, in 1825.
 Arthur Gerald Wellesley (d. 1768), who was named after his maternal grandfather but died young.
 William Wellesley-Pole, 3rd Earl of Mornington (1763–1845), who married Katherine Forbes, daughter of Adm. John Forbes and Lady Mary Capell (a daughter of the 3rd Earl of Essex), in 1784.
 Francis Wellesley (1767–1770), who died in childhood.
 Lady Anne Wellesley (1768–1844), who married Henry FitzRoy, a younger son of Charles FitzRoy, 1st Baron Southampton (descendants of an illegitimate son of King Charles II). After his death she married Charles Culling Smith.
 Arthur Wellesley, 1st Duke of Wellington (1769–1852), who married Catherine Pakenham, daughter of Edward Pakenham, 2nd Baron Longford and Catherine Rowley, in 1806.
 Gerald Valerian Wellesley (1770–1848), who married Lady Emily Cadogan, daughter of Charles Cadogan, 1st Earl Cadogan and Mary Churchill (daughter of Charles Churchill); he was the father of Adm. Sir George Wellesley.
 Lady Mary Elizabeth Wellesley (1772–1794), who died at age 22.
 Henry Wellesley, 1st Baron Cowley (1773–1847), who married Lady Charlotte Cadogan, also a daughter of the 1st Earl Cadogan, in 1803. They divorced by Act of Parliament in 1810, and he married, secondly, to Lady Georgiana Cecil, daughter of James Cecil, 1st Marquess of Salisbury and Lady Emily Hill, in 1816.

Four of Lord Mornington's five sons were created peers in the Peerages of Great Britain and the United Kingdom. The Barony of Wellesley (held by the Marquess Wellesley) and the Barony of Maryborough are now extinct, whilst the Dukedom of Wellington and Barony of Cowley are extant. The Earldom of Mornington is held by the Dukes of Wellington, and the Barons Cowley have since been elevated to be Earls Cowley.

Legacy
Four streets in Camden Town, which formed part of the estate of his son-in-law Henry FitzRoy, were named Mornington Crescent, Place, Street and Terrace after him. Of these, the first has since become famous as the name of a London Underground station.

References

External links
 
 Article from thepeerage.com
 
 

1735 births
1781 deaths
18th-century classical composers
18th-century British male musicians
Alumni of Trinity College Dublin
Classical-period composers
Earls of Mornington
Irish Anglicans
Irish classical composers
Irish MPs 1727–1760
Irish male classical composers
Members of the Parliament of Ireland (pre-1801) for County Meath constituencies
Members of the Privy Council of Ireland
Musicians who were peers
Parents of prime ministers of the United Kingdom
People from County Meath
Garret Wesley, 1st Earl of Mornington